Lawrence Bernhart Anderson (May 7, 1906 – April 6, 1994) was an American architect and educator and an early proponent of the International Style in the US. He  was born in Geneva, Minnesota, earned a bachelor's degree in liberal arts in 1927 and a bachelor's degree in architecture in 1928, both from the University of Minnesota. Anderson taught at the University of Virginia for two years before earning a master's degree in architecture from the Massachusetts Institute of Technology (MIT) in 1930. While a graduate student at MIT, Anderson earned the prestigious Paris Prize for post-graduate study at the Ecole des Beaux Arts in Paris. Anderson was hired by MIT in 1933 and taught in the Department of Architecture for 46 years and served as head of the department from 1947 to 1965 and as dean of the School of Architecture and Planning from 1965 until his retirement in 1972. He was elected a Fellow of the American Academy of Arts and Sciences in 1953.

References

External links
Oral history interview with Lawrence Anderson, 1992 Jan. 30-Mar. 30 from the Smithsonian Archives of American Art
Lawrence B. Anderson '30 video memorial from the MIT School of Architecture and Planning

Modernist architects from the United States
1906 births
1994 deaths
American alumni of the École des Beaux-Arts
Fellows of the American Academy of Arts and Sciences
MIT School of Architecture and Planning alumni
Modernist architects
People from Geneva, Minnesota
University of Minnesota School of Architecture alumni
20th-century American architects
MIT School of Architecture and Planning faculty